David Sewart is a former Director of Student Services and Professor in Distance Education for the British Open University (OU), where he was employed from 1971 until retirement in 2004. He also worked part-time as a tutor and completed the OU's MBA programme as a student.

Awards
2003–04: ICDE Prize of Excellence, Prize for Lifelong Contribution

References

Year of birth missing (living people)
Living people
Academics of the Open University